Canini is a taxonomic rank which represents the dog-like tribe of the subfamily Caninae (the canines), and is sister to the fox-like tribe Vulpini. The Canini came into existence 9 million years ago. This group was first represented by Eucyon, mostly by Eucyon davisi that was spread widely across North America and is basal to the other members of the tribe. Its members are informally known as true dogs.

Taxonomy

Members of this tribe include:

Common names of most of the South American canines include "fox", based on resemblance, but they are more closely related to wolves than to vulpini, the Eurasian and North American foxes.

The cladogram below is based on the phylogeny of Lindblad-Toh et al. (2005), modified to incorporate recent findings on Canis species, Lycalopex species, and Dusicyon.

References

External links

 
Mammal tribes
Canines